The Chișinău Botanical Garden of the Academy of Sciences of Moldova was founded in 1950 by the Russian Academy of Science. The garden is located in Chișinău, Botanica, Moldova, and covers an area of 76 hectares. In 1973, a new botanical garden was established in the Botanica sector of Chișinău. Two years later, the garden was given the status of a Research Institute of the Academy of Sciences of Moldovan SSR.  There are around ten thousand species of plants in the garden.

Concerns
In 2001, a large portion of the botanical garden was leased to private companies, including Elat, which established a series of restaurants, playgrounds, ice cream parlors, and a zoo. The popularity of the botanical garden surged; thousands of visitors came, and between 300 and 400 cars entered the garden daily. The administration also reported up to 30–40 weddings per weekend.

These activities were brought to the attention of several ecological organizations in Moldova. Alexandru Ciubotaru, the director of the Botanical Garden, explained that the Academy of Science of Moldova allowed the commercialization of the garden because they were, at the time, under-budgeted by the Moldovan Government. "We only receive 800,000 lei a year and the heating alone costs 1.2 million lei," he said. However, because Elat dishonored many of the agreements that it signed, the administration of the botanical garden has repeatedly asked  to revoke the contract.

In 2005, the botanical garden received 700,000 lei from the Moldovan Ministry of Finance and was able to change its heating system, reducing heating costs to about 280,000 lei. The director said that the garden would slowly solve most of its problems on its own, refusing to renew the lease with Elat, which expired on July 7, 2005.

References

Chișinău
1950 establishments in the Moldavian Soviet Socialist Republic
Botanical gardens in Moldova